The extinct Hibito–Cholón or Cholónan languages form a proposed language family that links two languages of Peru, Hibito and Cholón, extinct . They may also be related to the extinct Culle language, and perhaps to the language of the Chachapoya, but the data for all of these languages is poor.

Language contact
Jolkesky (2016) notes that there are lexical similarities with the Kechua, Leko, Mapudungun, Mochika, Kandoshi, Muniche, and Barbakoa language families due to contact.

Lexicon
Several basic Hibito and Cholon words appear to be related, though the data on both languages is poor. The following examples are given in the ad hoc orthography of the three sources we have on these languages:

{|class="wikitable"
|-
!  !! tree !! water !! daughter !! son 
|-
! Cholón
| mech / meš 
| cot / quõt / köta 
| ñu / -ñu 
| pul / -pul 
|-
! Hibito
| mixs / mitš 
| cachi / otšj 
| ñoo 
| pool 
|}

Comparative word list of Hibito and Cholon from Loukotka (1949):

Notes
(Sp.) = Spanish loanword (excluded)

Sources used by Loukotka (1949) — Hibito
Manuscript by Martínez Compañón from the 1700s
Tessmann (1930)

Sources Loukotka (1949) — Cholon
Mata (1748)
Tessmann (1930)

{| class="wikitable sortable"
! French gloss (original) !! English gloss (translated) !! Hibito !! Cholon !! comparisons
|-
| animal || animal || (Sp.) || (Sp.) || 
|-
| arbre || tree || mixs || mees-ñgup || 
|-
| boire || drink || vvik || nig || 
|-
| ciel || sky || puxam || senta || 
|-
| cœur || heart || thuo-suik || aluñač || 
|-
| dieu || God || diosču || (Sp.) || 
|-
| douleur || pain || kalak || ysiam || 
|-
| eau || water || kači || kot || Tessmann: oč, köta
|-
| étoiles || stars || kuičas || ke-nak || 
|-
| femme || woman || etlek || yla || Tessmann: udú, hilá
|-
| feu || fire || ukče || vet || Tessmann: olmó, utmo
|-
| fille || daughter || noo || añu || 
|-
| fils || son || pool || apul || 
|-
| fleur || flower || čukčum || ñuñap || 
|-
| fleuve || river || sekllutkači || kot-ysokot || 
|-
| frère || brother || moskaá || azot || Katakao: aszat = homme
|-
| fruit || fruit || llagna || keniya || 
|-
| gai || happy || musugvem || augilubaktam || 
|-
| herbe || grass || kiak || pullo || 
|-
| homme || man || nuum || num || Tessmann: núm, lúno
|-
| lune || moon || kuiná || peel || Tessmann: winžö, pel
|-
| manger || eat || lopkem || amok || 
|-
| mer || sea || lapomkači || sokotlol || 
|-
| mère || mother || keek || appan || 
|-
| mort || dead || huank || mikol || 
|-
| mourir || die || kalgeskam || ñgoli-čo || 
|-
| oiseau || bird || kumkoči || zuksill || 
|-
| ondes || waves || omium || ypixsimam || 
|-
| père || father || kotk || appa || 
|-
| pleurer || cry || atzakkem || yo-yam || 
|-
| pluie || rain || laamčus || llisiak || 
|-
| poisson || fish || kazop || asua || 
|-
| rameau || branch || mixnul || pučup || 
|-
| régner || reign || kollam || časam || 
|-
| sœur || sister || moskaá || akiñiu || 
|-
| soleil || sun || ñim || musak || Tessmann: nim, mušápo
|-
| terre || earth || kaloč || lluspey || 
|-
| tronc || trunk || sangoč || sangoč || 
|-
| vent || wind || koktom || mam || 
|-
| viande || meat || amaá || čep || 
|}

References

Alain Fabre, 2005, Diccionario etnolingüístico y guía bibliográfica de los pueblos indígenas sudamericanos: CHOLÓN

 
Proposed language families
Language families